In the Spanish Golden Age (Siglo de Oro) tradition, a comedia is a three-act play combining dramatic and comic elements.  The principal characters are noblemen (galanes, sing. galán) and ladies (damas) who work out a plot involving love, jealousy, honor and sometimes also piety or patriotism. Supporting characters include comical servants (graciosos) who assist their employers in carrying out the action.

Largely created and defined by Lope de Vega, the style is defined by a mixture of tragedy and comedy.  Originally referred to loosely as "tragicomedy", the name was eventually shortened to simply "comedia".

See also
Commedia dell'arte

References

Theatrical genres
Spanish Golden Age literary genres